The Munster Football Intermediate Club Championship is an annual Gaelic football competition organised by the Munster Council of the Gaelic Athletic Association since 2003 for the top intermediate clubs in the province of Munster in Ireland. It is sponsored by Allied Irish Bank and therefore officially known as the AIB Munster GAA Football Intermediate Club Championship.

The series of games are played during the autumn and winter months with the Munster final currently being played in late November. The championship has always been played on a straight knockout basis whereby once a team loses they are eliminated from the series.

The Munster Championship is an integral part of the wider All-Ireland Intermediate Club Football Championship. The winners of the Munster final join the champions of Connacht, Leinster and Ulster in the semi-final stages of the All-Ireland series of games.

Six clubs currently participate in the Munster Championship.

The title has been won at least once by clubs representing just two of the six Munster counties, with Kerry and Cork clubs holding the distinction of sharing every provincial title. The all-time record-holders are Carbery Rangers and Ardfert who have won the competition twice each.

Roll of Honour

List of Munster finals

References

External links
 All-time roll of honour

Intermediate